Roquette is a French-based family owned company which produces more than 650 by-products from the starch extracted from corn, wheat, potatoes and peas. 
Founded and headquartered in Lestrem, France in 1933 by the brothers Dominique and Germain Roquette, Roquette has grown to become the leader in starch production in Europe and the number four ranked producer of starch worldwide. 
It is also the leader in the production of Polyols worldwide (substances derived from food compounds). Roquette employs more than 8,360 people globally and achieved a turnover of over 2,5 billion euros in 2011.

History
At the beginning of the Great Depression in 1933 grain brokers Dominique and Germain Roquette along with the aid of ICAM engineer Adam Grunewald created a potato starch plant named Roquette in Lestrem. From this point on Roquette has grown to 30 establishments. Below is a list of the firm's major development stages since its beginning.    
1933 - Dominique and Germain Roquette start the first Roquette potato starch plant in Lestrem, France
1946 - Construction of the corn starch plant in Lestrem, France
1954 - Lestrem facility begins industrial production of sorbitol
1956 - Construction of the potato starch plant in Vecquemont, France
1961 - Construction of the corn starch plant in Cassano Spinola, Italy
1977 - Construction of the corn starch plant in Beinheim, France
1982 - Construction of the sorbitol production unit in Gurnee, Illinois, United States
1986 - Construction of  the wheat starch plant at Lestrem, France facility
1991 - Take-over of a corn starch plant in Keokuk, Iowa, United States
1993 - Lestrem facility launches the start of maltitol production
1997 - Take-over of the corn starch plant in Calafat, Romania
1998 - Construction of the wheat starch plant in Beinheim, France
2000 - Take-over of the wheat starch plant in Corby, England, as of September 2020, staff were advised that the plant will cease production as of 20 December 2020, all staff will be made redundant.
2001 - Take-over of two sorbitol production units in Lianyungang, Jiangsu, China and Ulsan, Korea
2008 - Take-over of the B.P.S. (Bioprodukte Steinberg), production of microalgae in Klotze, Germany

Locations
Worldwide Roquette has 18 production sites and 12 offices located on three continents, Europe, Asia, and North America. Lestrem is the largest Roquette facility in Europe and is home to the companies main research and development center which employs more than 250 researchers. Along with the Lestrem facility Europe is home to 4 Roquette offices and 10 other production facilities (6 of which are found in France).

Since the 1980s, Roquette has been strengthening its international presence with various factories or offices in the United States, China, Korea, Japan, India, Russia and Mexico.  The United States is home to 2 production sites found in Keokuk, Iowa and Gurnee, Illinois. Roquette also has 2 Chinese production plants found in Nanning, Guangxi and Lianyungang, Jiangsu. A third Asian production plant is located in Ulsan, Korea.

Products
Roquette's products fall into five major product categories; native starches and proteins, physically and chemically modified starches, hydrolyzed and isomerised products, hydrogenated products, and fermentation process derivatives and fine chemicals. In 2021, Roquette ranked first in the Modified Starch category of FoodTalks' Global Food Thickener Companies list and third on Foodtalks' Global Top 40 Plant Protein Companies list. Roquette is world leader in polyols (sugar alcohols) such as Lycasin.

Legal disputes 
In November 2010, Roquette Freres SA joined with Solazyme Inc., a San Francisco maker of algae-based biofuel and nutritional products, to form Solazyme Roquette Nutritionals LLC (SRN). Solazyme Inc. leaves the venture in June 2013.

In mid-2014, Roquette announces the opening of a microalgae production unit at its industrial site in Lestrem, France.

In February 2015 Roquette Freres SA loses legal battle against Solazyme Inc. with the arbitration panel awarding all SRN patents to Solazyme Inc.

References

Food manufacturers of France
Starch companies
1933 establishments in France
Pharmaceutical companies of France
Companies based in Hauts-de-France